CSPL may refer to:

Cheng San Public Library, a public library in Hougang, Singapore
Committee on Standards in Public Life, an advisory non-departmental public body of the United Kingdom Government